Ruhl Lake is a lake in the township municipality of Brockton, Bruce County in Southwestern Ontario, Canada. It is in the Lake Huron drainage basin and is the source of Ruhl Creek.

References

Lakes of Bruce County